The 2007 World Port Tournament was an international baseball competition held at the DOOR Neptunus Familiestadion in Rotterdam, the Netherlands from August 2–12, 2007.  It was the 11th edition of the tournament and featured teams from Chinese Taipei, Cuba, Japan, the Netherlands and the United States.

Cuba won the tournament with a 2–0 victory over the Chinese Taipei in the championship game. Yosvani Pérez was named the tournament's most valuable player.

Group stage

Standings

 Chinese Taipei is the official IBAF designation for the team representing the state officially referred to as the Republic of China, more commonly known as Taiwan. (See also political status of Taiwan for details.)
 Final placement for 2nd through 4th in group play is based on the results of the individual games between Chinese Taipei, the United States and the Netherlands (games 4, 6, 8, 14, 16 and 17).

Game Results

Championship Game

Tournament Awards & Statistics

References

External links
Official website

World Port Tournament
World Port Tournament
2007 in Dutch sport